Broken Blossoms or The Yellow Man and the Girl, often referred to simply as Broken Blossoms, is a 1919 American silent drama film directed by D. W. Griffith. It was distributed by United Artists and premiered on May 13, 1919. It stars Lillian Gish, Richard Barthelmess, and Donald Crisp, and tells the story of young girl, Lucy Burrows, who is abused by her alcoholic prizefighting father, Battling Burrows, and meets Cheng Huan, a kind-hearted Chinese man who falls in love with her. It was the first film distributed by United Artists. It is based on Thomas Burke's short story "The Chink and the Child" from the 1916 collection Limehouse Nights. In 1996, Broken Blossoms was included in the annual selection of 25 motion pictures to be added to the National Film Registry of the Library of Congress.

Plot
 
Cheng Huan leaves his native China because he "dreams to spread the gentle message of Buddha to the Anglo-Saxon lands." His idealism fades as he is faced with the brutal reality of London's gritty inner-city. However, his mission is finally realized in his devotion to the "broken blossom" Lucy Burrows, the beautiful but unwanted and abused daughter of boxer Battling Burrows.

After being beaten and discarded one evening by her raging father, Lucy finds sanctuary in Cheng's home, the beautiful and exotic room above his shop. As Cheng nurses Lucy back to health, the two form a bond as two unwanted outcasts of society. All goes astray for them when Lucy's father gets wind of his daughter's whereabouts and in a drunken rage drags her back to their home to punish her. Fearing for her life, Lucy locks herself inside a closet to escape her contemptuous father.

By the time Cheng arrives to rescue Lucy, whom he so innocently adores, it is too late. Lucy's lifeless body lies on her modest bed as Battling has a drink in the other room. As Cheng gazes at Lucy's youthful face which, in spite of the circumstances, beams with innocence and even the slightest hint of a smile, Battling enters the room to make his escape. The two stand for a long while, exchanging spiteful glances, until Battling lunges for Cheng with a hatchet, and Cheng retaliates by shooting Burrows repeatedly with his handgun. After returning to his home with Lucy's body, Cheng builds a shrine to Buddha and takes his own life with a knife to the chest.

Cast
 Lillian Gish as Lucy Burrows
 Richard Barthelmess as Cheng Huan
 Donald Crisp as Battling Burrows
 Arthur Howard as Burrows' manager
 Edward Peil Sr. as Evil Eye
 George Beranger as The Spying One
 Norman Selby (aka Kid McCoy) as A prizefighter

Production and style

Unlike Griffith's more extravagant earlier works like The Birth of a Nation or Intolerance, Broken Blossoms is a small-scale film that uses controlled studio environments to create a more intimate effect.

Griffith was known for his willingness to collaborate with his actors and on many occasions join them in research outings.

The visual style of Broken Blossoms emphasizes the seedy Limehouse streets with their dark shadows, drug addicts and drunkards, contrasting them with the beauty of Cheng and Lucy's innocent attachment as expressed by Cheng's decorative apartment. Conversely, the Burrows' bare cell reeks of oppression and hostility. Film critic and historian Richard Schickel goes so far as to credit this gritty realism with inspiring "the likes of Pabst, Stiller, von Sternberg, and others, [and then] re-emerging in the United States in the sound era, in the genre identified as Film Noir".

Griffith was unsure of his final product and took several months to complete the editing, saying: "I can't look at the damn thing; it depresses me so."

Box office
The film was originally made for Famous Players Lasky. The company sold it to the newly founded United Artists for $250,000. The film turned out to be a hit at the box office and earned a profit of $700,000.

Reception

Broken Blossoms premiered in May 1919, at George M. Cohan's Theatre in New York City as part of the D. W. Griffith Repertory Season. According to Lillian Gish's autobiography, theaters were decorated with flowers, moon lanterns and beautiful Chinese brocaded draperies for the premiere. Critics and audiences were pleased with Griffith's follow-up film to his 1916 epic Intolerance. Contrasting with Intolerance'''s grand story, set and length, Griffith charmed audiences by the delicacy with which Broken Blossoms handled such a complex subject.

The scenes of child abuse nauseated backers when Griffith gave them a preview of the film; according to Lillian Gish in interviews, a Variety reporter invited to sit in on a second take left the room to vomit.
Today, Broken Blossoms is widely regarded as one of Griffith's finest works. In 2012, the film received five critics' votes and one director's vote in the British Film Institute's decennial Sight & Sound poll. Roger Ebert was a longtime champion of the film, having added it to his "Great Movies" series; and in 1996, it was selected for preservation in the United States National Film Registry by the Library of Congress as being "culturally, historically, or aesthetically significant".

Review aggregation site They Shoot Pictures, Don't They has since found Broken Blossoms to be the 261st most acclaimed film in history.

Akira Kurosawa, the legendary Japanese director, named this movie as one of his 100 favorite films.

Themes
Cruelty and injustice against the innocent are a recurring theme in Griffith's films and are graphically portrayed here. The introductory card says, "We may believe there are no Battling Burrows, striking the helpless with brutal whip — but do we not ourselves use the whip of unkind words and deeds? So, perhaps, Battling may even carry a message of warning."Broken Blossoms was released during a period of strong anti-Chinese feeling in the US, a fear known as the Yellow Peril. The phrase "yellow peril" was common in the U.S. newspapers owned by William Randolph Hearst.  It was also the title of a popular book by an influential U.S. religious figure, G. G. Rupert, who published The Yellow Peril; or, Orient vs. Occident in 1911. Griffith changed Burke's original story to promote a message of tolerance. In Burke's story, the Chinese protagonist is a sordid young Shanghai drifter pressed into naval service, who frequents opium dens and whorehouses; in the film, he becomes a Buddhist missionary whose initial goal is to spread the word of Buddha and peace (although he is also shown frequenting opium dens when he is depressed). Even at his lowest point, he still prevents his gambling companions from fighting.

The "closet scene"
The most-discussed scene in Broken Blossoms is Lillian Gish's "closet" scene. Here Gish performs Lucy's horror by writhing in the claustrophobic space like a tortured animal who knows there is no escape. There is more than one anecdote about the filming of the "closet" scene, Richard Schickel writes:

The scene is also used to demonstrate Griffith's uncanny ability to create an aural effect with only an image. Gish's screams apparently attracted such a crowd outside the studio that people needed to be held back.

Remake
A UK remake, also titled Broken Blossoms, followed in 1936.

References

External links

 Broken Blossoms essay by Ed Gonzalez at National Film Registry. Broken Blossoms essay by Daniel Eagan in America's Film Legacy: The Authoritative Guide to the Landmark Movies in the National Film Registry, A&C Black, 2010 , pp. 63–64 

In-depth analysis of Broken Blossoms at filmsite.org
Film Review - Broken Blossoms, Toronto World, November 7, 1919, p. 10.
The review of Broken Blossoms from Current Opinion Magazine'' (1919)

1919 films
1919 romantic drama films
1910s American films
1910s English-language films
American black-and-white films
American romantic drama films
American silent feature films
Articles containing video clips
Films about Buddhism
Films about domestic violence
Films about interracial romance
Films about race and ethnicity
Films based on short fiction
Films based on works by Thomas Burke
Films directed by D. W. Griffith
Films set in London
Silent American drama films
Silent romantic drama films
Surviving American silent films
United States National Film Registry films